There are three major law enforcement/security entities in Suriname.

Organisations

Korps Politie Suriname 
The largest force and the most published in the media is the Korps Politie Suriname (KPS). This is a traditional police department model and is responsible for all the policing efforts. Under the main umbrella of the KPS, there are three branches.
The city police handle all issues inside the city limits of Paramaribo.
 The rural police handle everything outside of Paramaribo.
 The Judicial Police are composed of specialised police units, such as forensics, fraud, homicide, etc.

Military police 
The second largest military police polices all members of the Surinamese Military and handles border control/immigration functions.

Directorate of National Security 
The third largest law enforcement/security entity are the Surinamese Directorate of National Security. The Directorate is responsible for the Central Intelligence and Security Service (CIVD) and the presidential personal security unit.

Bijstands- en Beveiligingsdienst Suriname
The Bijstands- en Beveiligingsdienst Suriname (BBS) is the assistance and security service of Suriname.

In general, the Security Service is responsible for:

 the protection of persons and property located in government buildings, public locations and markets;
 the security of government buildings;
 effective and alert fire prevention;
 the security and assistance of the various disbursements to be made by the government agencies in the city and district.
 The Minister may entrust the Security Service with the security of specially designated persons and objects.

Human rights 
LGBT individuals have made claims of police mistreatment in Paramaribo. A 2012 UN report stated that Suriname's police scored the lowest in the region in communicating respectably with citizens.

See also 
 Crime in Suriname
 Law enforcement in the Netherlands

References 

 
Law of Suriname